Lukáš Lacko was the defending champion but lost in the quarterfinals to Cem İlkel.

Marsel İlhan won the title after defeating İlkel 6–2, 6–4 in the final.

Seeds

Draw

Finals

Top half

Bottom half

References
Main Draw
Qualifying Draw

Turk Telecom Izmir Cup - Singles
2016 Türk Telecom İzmir Cup